Imbaimadai Airport  is an airport serving the village of Imbaimadai, in the Cuyuni-Mazaruni Region of Guyana.

See also

 List of airports in Guyana
 Transport in Guyana

References

External links
Imbaimadai Airport
OpenStreetMap - Imbaimadai
OurAirports - Imbaimadai

Airports in Guyana